The Barber-Pittman House in Valdosta, Georgia was built in 1915.  It was a work of architect Lloyd Barton Greer.  The house was built for E.R. Barber, who was both an inventor and the first Coca-Cola bottler located outside Atlanta. The builder's daughter, Ola Barber Pittman, gave the house to the citizens of Valdosta on the condition that the house would not be sold. The house was restored and is used as the headquarters for the Valdosta-Lowndes Chamber of Commerce. It was listed on the National Register of Historic Places in 1980.  The listing included three contributing buildings.

References

External links
 

Houses on the National Register of Historic Places in Georgia (U.S. state)
Houses completed in 1915
Houses in Lowndes County, Georgia
Valdosta, Georgia
National Register of Historic Places in Lowndes County, Georgia